The Dongping dialect is a Mandarin Chinese dialect spoken in Dongping County in Shandong province, China.

Tones

Vocabulary

References

Varieties of Chinese
Mandarin Chinese